Why Is There Air? (1965) is Bill Cosby's third album. It was recorded at the Flamingo Hotel in Las Vegas, Nevada. It won the 1966 Grammy Award for Best Comedy Album.

The final track, "Hofstra", is an expanded re-telling of the "TV Football" routine from Cosby's second album, I Started Out as a Child. "I played for Temple University, and it's the truth," he says, "Don't keep asking 'Did you really play?' Yes, I really played. At one time I had a beautiful body."

Track listing

Side one
Kindergarten  – 8:15
Personal Hygiene  – 1:04
Shop  – 3:10
Baby  – 3:49
Driving in San Francisco  – 3:45

Side two
$75 Car  – 7:40
The Toothache  – 4:10
Hofstra  – 8:00

Legacy
Jerry Seinfeld has cited this album as a major influence, stating that it "drove [him] crazy" and inspired his career as a comedian.

References

Bill Cosby live albums
Stand-up comedy albums
Spoken word albums by American artists
Live spoken word albums
1965 live albums
Warner Records live albums
Grammy Award for Best Comedy Album
1960s comedy albums
1960s spoken word albums
Albums produced by Allan Sherman
Albums recorded at the Flamingo Las Vegas